Chris O'Sullivan (born 22 April 1968) is a former Australian rules footballer who played with the Brisbane Bears in the Victorian/Australian Football League (VFL/AFL).

O'Sullivan, a Victorian, was selected by Brisbane with the 72nd pick of the 1988 VFL Draft. He played eight games in 1989 but could only manage two more in 1990. His efforts with QAFL club Southport in 1992 were good enough to win him a Grogan Medal, in a three way tie. He now works as a brand manager.

References

External links
 
 

1968 births
Australian rules footballers from Victoria (Australia)
Brisbane Bears players
Southport Australian Football Club players
Living people